Narva is the third largest city in Estonia.

Narva may also refer to:
Narva River
Narva Reservoir
Narva culture, an archaeological culture
Narva castle
Narva Gate
Narva Power Plants
Narva highway
Narva Bay
Narva, Narayanpet district, a mandal in Telangana
Narva, Ontario, a municipality in Ontario, Canada
Narva, Krasnoyarsk Krai in Mansky District, Russia
Narva, Primorsky Krai, Russia
Narva River, Primorsky Krai, a river in Primorsky Krai, Russia which flows into Amur Bay
Narva Bay, Primorsky Krai, a bay of the Amur Bay in Primorsky Krai, Russia on which the selo of Narva stands
Narva Triumphal Arch, an arch in St. Petersburg, Russia
, a British cargo ship in service 1946–1957

People
Mai Narva (born 1999), Estonian chess player
Regina Narva (born 1970), Estonian chess player
Triin Narva (born 1994), Estonian chess player